Night Moves are an American indie rock band originating from Minneapolis.

History
Night Moves began in 2012, releasing their first full-length record titled Colored Emotions on Domino Records. In 2016, Night Moves released their second full-length album on Domino titled Pennied Days. In 2019, Night Moves released their third full-length album on Domino titled Can You Really Find Me.

Discography
Studio albums
Colored Emotions (2012, Domino)
Pennied Days (2016, Domino)
Can You Really Find Me (2019, Domino)

Extended Plays
Carl Sagan EP (2017, Domino)
The Redaction (2022, Domino)

References

Indie rock musical groups from Minnesota
Musical groups from the Twin Cities